LIGC may refer to:

 National Library of Wales
 2-hydroxy-4-carboxymuconate semialdehyde hemiacetal dehydrogenase or LigC, an enzyme